Əfəndilər is a village in the Qubadli District of Azerbaijan.

History 
The village was located in the Armenian-occupied territories surrounding Nagorno-Karabakh, coming under the control of ethnic Armenian forces during the First Nagorno-Karabakh War in August 1993. The village subsequently became part of the breakaway Republic of Artsakh as part of its Kashatagh Province, referred to as Aygek. It was recaptured by Azerbaijan on 25 October 2020 during the 2020 Nagorno-Karabakh war.

Historical heritage sites 
Historical heritage sites in and around the village include a mosque from the early 20th century.

Demographics 
The village had 104 inhabitants in 2005, and 94 inhabitants in 2015.

References

External links 
 

Populated places in Qubadli District